Oh my gosh may refer to:

Songs
 "Oh My Gosh" (Basement Jaxx song), 2005
 "OMG (Oh My Gosh)", by Sabrina Washington, 2010
 "OMG" (Usher song), or "Oh My Gosh", 2010
 "Oh My Gosh!", by AlphaBat, 2014
 "Oh My Gosh", by Boy Story, 2019
 "Oh My Gosh", by Machel Montano and Xtatik from Here Comes the Band, 2000
 "Oh My Gosh", by MC Skepta from Microphone Champion, 2009
 "Oh My Gosh", by Nature, 2020
 "Oh My Gosh", by Seo In-young, 2011
 "Oh My Gosh", by Yemi Alade from Woman of Steel, 2019
 "Oh My Gosh", by Yung6ix, 2011

Other uses
 Oh My Gosh! Tour, by comedian Charlie Berens

See also
 Gosh (disambiguation)
 Oh My (disambiguation)
 Oh My God (disambiguation)
 OMG (disambiguation)
 Euphemism
 Gosh darn
 Minced oath